Dildar Ahmad s/o Ghulam Qadir is a Pakistani heavyweight boxer. He was born in a village of Faisalabad named Chak No. 571 G.B. He is now living in Rehman Town in Faisalabad. His height is 6 ft 8 inches. He has won 9 gold medals in international competitions. He has also won 2 gold medals in SAF games.  His boxing career spanned from 1987 to 1993.
He retired from Pak Army in 1997.  In 2010 Ahmed received a financial grant from the Pakistan Sports Board.

References

Living people
Asian Games bronze medalists for Pakistan
Asian Games medalists in boxing
Boxers at the 1990 Asian Games
Pakistani male boxers
Medalists at the 1990 Asian Games
Year of birth missing (living people)
Heavyweight boxers
20th-century Pakistani people